Contimporanul (antiquated spelling of the Romanian word for "the Contemporary", singular masculine form) was a Romanian (initially a weekly and later a monthly) avant-garde literary and art magazine, published in Bucharest between June 1922 and 1932. Edited by Ion Vinea, Contimporanul was prolific in the area of art criticism, dedicating entire issues to modern art phenomena, and organizing the Bucharest International Modern Art Exhibit in December 1924 (with the participation of Constantin Brâncuși).

Several writers contributing to Contimporanul soon moved on to adopt more specific styles, including a literary form of constructivism (which was the dominant style of the magazine for a certain period), Dada, and, eventually, surrealism.

History
Seeing itself as a direct successor to Contemporanul, it first advertised itself as a "social magazine", it became a voice for modernism in 1924, when it published a manifesto virulently attacking the cultural establishment (Manifest activist către tinerime - "Activist Manifesto to the Youth"). It stated:
"Down with Art
For it has prostituted itself!
[...]
WE WANT
the miracle of the new and self-reliant word; the strict and swift eloquent expression of Morse-code machines."

In 1924, between November 30 and December 30, in the hall of the Fine Arts Trade Unions in 6 Corabiei Street, Bucharest, the magazine organized the International Contemporary Exhibition in which almost all members of the Romanian avant-garde exhibited. The exhibition established the magazine as one of the leading publications of European avant-garde.  

Throughout its existence, Contimporanul was a virulent opponent of Gândirea; thus, it kept a more reserved attitude toward Expressionism (which was promoted by the latter). Nevertheless, it published articles by Herwarth Walden, and several other of its contributors were enthusiastic supporters of Der Sturm guidelines.

Notable contributors

Romanian
Felix Aderca
Tudor Arghezi
Ion Barbu
Dan Botta
Constantin Brâncuși 
N. D. Cocea
Jacques G. Costin
Sergiu Dan
Victor Eftimiu
Mircea Eliade
Benjamin Fondane
Marcel Janco
Eugen Jebeleanu
János Mattis-Teutsch
M. H. Maxy
Ion Minulescu
Camil Petrescu
Ion Pillat
Mihail Sebastian
Claude Sernet
Păstorel Teodoreanu
Tristan Tzara
Sandu Tudor
Ilarie Voronca

Foreign
Hans Arp
André Breton
Paul Éluard
Filippo Tommaso Marinetti
Paul Klee
Herwarth Walden

Notes

References
Dan Grigorescu, Istoria unei generaţii pierdute: expresioniştii, Ed. Eminescu, Bucharest, 1980
Eugen Marinescu (ed.), Din presa literară românească (1918-1944), Ed. Albatros, Bucharest, 1986

External links
Contimporanul archive, Babeş-Bolyai University Transsylvanica Online Library

 
Defunct literary magazines published in Europe
Defunct magazines published in Romania
Magazines established in 1922
Magazines disestablished in 1932
Magazines published in Bucharest
Visual arts magazines published in Romania
Literary magazines published in Romania
Political magazines published in Romania
Romanian-language magazines